Per Anders Mikael Karlsson (27 April 1963 – 23 November 2015) was a Swedish football goalkeeper. He appeared in 413 games for Örebro SK, which is a club record. More than 200 of these games were in Allsvenskan.

Personal life 
He died in 2015 when speed skating at Hjälmaren, whereupon he went through the ice. His body was found in April 2016.

References

1963 births
2015 deaths
Swedish footballers
Örebro SK players
Association football goalkeepers
Allsvenskan players
Sport deaths in Sweden